Union Pacific No. 119 was a 4-4-0 steam locomotive made famous for meeting the Central Pacific Railroad's Jupiter at Promontory Summit, Utah, during the Golden Spike ceremony commemorating the completion of the First transcontinental railroad in 1869. The locomotive was built by Rogers Locomotive and Machine Works of Paterson, New Jersey in 1868, along with numbers 116, 117, 118 and 120. The original was scrapped in 1903, but a replica now operates at the Golden Spike National Historical Park.

Promontory Summit
No. 119 was assigned to the Union Pacific Railroad's Utah Division, carrying trains between Rawlins, Wyoming and Ogden, Utah, and was stationed in the latter when a call for a replacement engine came from vice-president Thomas C. Durant, to take him to Promontory Ridge, Utah Territory, for the Golden Spike ceremony celebrating the completion of the Transcontinental Railroad.  While enroute to the ceremony, a swollen river had washed away some supports to the Devil's Gate Bridge.  Durant's engineer refused to take his engine across, consenting only to nudging the lighter passenger cars over the span.  It held, but this left Durant and his entourage without an engine.  No. 119 was sent from Ogden to take them the short distance to Promontory, where it was memorialized in photos and history faced nose to nose with the Central Pacific's Jupiter.

In Andrew J. Russell's famous photograph of the Meeting of the Lines, No. 119 is seen on the right with its engineer, Sam Bradford, leaning off the pilot holding a bottle of champagne up to Jupiter engineer George Booth. Bradford and Booth would later break a bottle of champagne over the other's locomotive in celebration.

Later career
After the Golden Spike run, 119 led a similar life to Jupiter, and returned to service as a freight locomotive. In 1882, 119 was renumbered to 343, and was scrapped in 1903.

Replicas

As was the case with the Jupiter, the Union Pacific only began to acknowledge the 119's historical significance well after it was scrapped. For a 1949 reenactment of the Golden Spike ceremony staged at the Chicago Railroad Fair the Chicago, Burlington, and Quincy Railroad's locomotive number 35 was cosmetically altered stand-in for the 119; likewise the Jupiter was a proxy provided by the Virginia and Truckee Railroad.

In 1968, the Union Pacific sponsored the construction of the Omaha Zoo Railroad in the Henry Doorly Zoo, including a narrow gauge replica of the 119, built by Crown Metal Products.

The First transcontinental railroad, the National Park Service's Golden Spike site at Promontory, Utah, had exhibited representations of the 119 and Jupiter on a portion of restored track where the original ceremony was held. In this instance, the 119 was portrayed by the Virginia and Truckee's Dayton locomotive, (which is ironic because the Dayton was built by the Central Pacific Railroad's shops in Sacramento) and was displayed here until it and the Jupiter, which was portrayed by that railroad's Inyo, were sold to the state of Nevada in 1974.

In 1975, the National Park Service embarked on a project to reproduce the Union Pacific No. 119 and Central Pacific Jupiter exactly as they appeared in 1869.  Since the original drawings had not survived, the Park Service initially approached Walt Disney Studios, which had previously built two steam engines from scratch for their Disneyland park's railroad, for the project. Disney declined, but recommended the O'Connor Engineering Laboratories in Costa Mesa, California, for the task.  Noted railroad historian and steam engine owner Gerald M. Best served as engineering consultant to the Park Service for the project.  Over 700 detailed engineering drawings were recreated, based almost entirely on the photographs taken of the engines during the ceremony. Disney animator and steam engine owner Ward Kimball did color matching and original artwork for the Jupiter and No. 119.

See also

 Jupiter locomotive
 Leviathan locomotive
 List of heritage railroads in the United States

References

External links

 

0119
4-4-0 locomotives
Rogers locomotives
Railway locomotives introduced in 1868
Steam locomotives of the United States
Individual locomotives of the United States
Scrapped locomotives
Standard gauge locomotives of the United States